Cornelius Sidler (July 18, 1871 – September 20, 1925) was a lawyer and politician.

Born in Milwaukee, Wisconsin, Sidler graduated from the University of Wisconsin and University of Wisconsin Law School in 1902. He was an attorney. In 1903, he served in the Wisconsin State Assembly and was a Republican.

Sidler died at his home in Grants Pass, Oregon.

References

1871 births
1925 deaths
Politicians from Milwaukee
People from Grants Pass, Oregon
University of Wisconsin–Madison alumni
University of Wisconsin Law School alumni
Wisconsin lawyers
Republican Party members of the Wisconsin State Assembly
19th-century American lawyers